Cosmisoma angustipenne is a species of beetle in the family Cerambycidae. It was described by Zajciw in 1958.

References

Cosmisoma
Beetles described in 1958
Taxa named by Dmytro Zajciw